The State Theatre Company of South Australia (STCSA), branded State Theatre Company South Australia, formerly the South Australian Theatre Company (SATC), is South Australia's leading professional theatre company, and a statutory corporation. It was established as the official state theatre company by the State Theatre Company of South Australia Act 1972, on the initiative of Premier Don Dunstan.

Many of the performances are staged at the Dunstan Playhouse and Space Theatre at the Adelaide Festival Centre.  the artistic director is Mitchell Butel. Notable actors, writers and directors working with the company have included Patrick White, Neil Armfield, Ruth Cracknell, Andrew Bovell, Judy Davis, Gale Edwards, Mel Gibson, Geoffrey Rush, Jim Sharman, Hugo Weaving, Elena Carapetis and John Wood.

History
The South Australian Theatre Company (SATC) was established in 1965 under the artistic direction of John Tasker. Tasker directed 10 plays before clashing with the board and leaving in 1967. Actor Leslie Dayman took over from Tasker and Peter Batey followed Dayman.

The date of establishment as the state theatre company dates from the State Theatre Company of South Australia Act of 1972, an initiative of then Premier Dunstan. The name of the company was changed to its current name in 1978 as a reflection of this act. The director of the company in its inaugural year was George Ogilvie.

In 1974, the SATC became the inaugural resident theatre company of the Adelaide Festival Centre, performing mostly in The Playhouse (later The Dunstan Playhouse and still the company's primary venue), and was the first state theatre company in Australia to hold its entire operations in one purpose-made building.

In 1977, Magpie Theatre was established as a theatre in education (TIE) branch of STCSA, for young people. After 20 years and numerous productions, it was terminated in 1997, partially due to loss of funding after reconstruction of Arts SA.

Under the artistic direction of Jim Sharman, the company was renamed Lighthouse from 1982 to 1983, operating as an ensemble theatre company with twelve actors: Robynne Bourne, Peter Cummins, Melissa Jaffer (replaced in 1983 by Jacqy Phillips), Alan John, Gillian Jones, Melita Jurisic, Russell Kiefel, Stuart McCreery, Robert Menzies (replaced by Robert Grubb), Geoffrey Rush, Kerry Walker and John Wood.

The company was subtitled Australian Playhouse from 1996 to 1997 during the tenure of Chris Westwood, the company's first female executive producer, appointed in 1993. She aimed at presenting only Australian works until the end of the century; however, she resigned at the end of 1997.

The board reported to Arts SA (later Arts South Australia) from 1993 until 2018, when it started reporting directly to the Department of the Premier and Cabinet.

From 2019 the company was branded "State Theatre Company South Australia", but official reports still refers to the legal name of "State Theatre Company of South Australia".

Venues
, the company's administration offices are based at the Lion Arts Centre, on the corner of Morphett Street and North Terrace, Adelaide. The company's main venue is the Dunstan Playhouse, but it also uses the Space Theatre, the Royalty Theatre in Angas Street, Adelaide, and the Thomas Edmonds Opera Studio at the Adelaide Showground. It holds its "Tangent" talks in the Hawke Building at UniSA's CityWest campus.

Directors
John Tasker (1965–67)
Leslie Dayman (1968–69)
Peter Batey (1970–71)
George Ogilvie (1972–1976)
Colin George (1977–1979)
Kevin Palmer (artistic director), Nick Enright (associate director) (1980–81) 
Jim Sharman (artistic director), Neil Armfield and Louis Nowra (associates) (1982–83) (as Lighthouse)
Keith Gallasch (1984–85)
John Gaden (artistic), Gale Edwards (associate) (1986–89)
Simon Phillips (1990–93)
Chris Westwood (executive producer) (1994–97)
Rodney Fisher (1998–99)
Rosalba Clemente (2000–04)
Adam Cook (2005–2012)
Geordie Brookman (2013–2018)
Mitchell Butel (2019–present).

Associate Directors
Michael Hill (2006–2008)
Geordie Brookman (2008–2010)
Catherine Fitzgerald (2011–2012)
Nescha Jelk (2013–2016)
Elena Carapetis (2017–2019)
Anthony Nicola (2020–present)

New works
Shows which have been commissioned by State Theatre Company South Australia include:
 2022 – Cathedral by Caleb Lewis 
 2022 – Antigone by Elena Carapetis 
 2021 – The Boy Who Talked To Dogs by Amy Conroy (co-production with Slingsby)
 2021 – Euphoria by Emily Steel (co-production with Country Arts SA)
 2021 – Hibernation by Finegan Kruckemeyer
 2020 – DECAMERON 2.0 (co-production with Actnow Theatre)
 2018 – In The Club by Patricia Cornelius
 2018 – Terrestrial by Fleur Kilpatrick
 2018 – The Gods of Strangers by Elena Carapetis
 2016 – Gorgon by Elena Carapetis
 2016 – Things I Know To Be True by Andrew Bovell (co-production with UK's Frantic Assembly)
 2014 – Jesikah by Phillip Kavanagh
 2014 – Little Bird by Nicki Bloom
 2013 – The Kreutzer Sonata by Sue Smith
 2013 – Maggie Stone by Caleb Lewis
 2009 – Metro Street by Matthew Robinson
 2009 – Maestro by Anna Goldsworthy and Peter Goldsworthy 
 2008 – Architektin by Robyn Archer
 2008 – When The Rain Stops Falling by Andrew Bovell (co-presentation with Brink Productions)
 2007 – Lion Pig Lion by Marty Denniss 
 2006 – Honk If You Are Jesus by Peter Goldsworthy and Martin Laud Gray (winner of the 2006 Ruby Award for Best New Work or Event) 
 2004 – Euripides' Trojan Women adapted by Rosalba Clemente and Dawn Langman 
 2004 – Night Letters by Robert Dessaix adapted by Susan Rogers and Chris Drummond
 2003 – drowning in my ocean of You by Fiona Sprott 
 2002 – My Life, My Love by Pat Rix 
 2001 – Holy Day by Andrew Bovell  (winner of 2 Green Room Awards)
 1986 – Dreams In An Empty City by Stephen Sewell
 1985 – Beautland by Barry Dickins
 1983 – Sunrise by Louis Nowra
 1983 – The Blind Giant Is Dancing by Stephen Sewell
 1983 – Netherwood by Patrick White
 1982 – Spellbound by Louis Nowra
 1982 – Royal Show by Louis Nowra
 1982 – Signal Driver: A Morality Play for the Times by Patrick White
 1978 – A Manual of Trench Warfare by Clem Gorman
 1978 – Marx by Ron Blair
 1976 – A Handful of Friends by David Williamson
 1974 – The Department by David Williamson

Awards for new work 
The company supports new work through its annual Flinders University Young Playwrights' Awards for writers under 25, offering dramaturgy and a professional reading to the winning scripts in junior (13–17) and senior (18–25) sections.

It also presents the Jill Blewett Playwright's Award, worth $12,500, awarded for an as yet unproduced play of any genre written by a professional South Australian playwright. It is presented at Adelaide Writer's Week during the Adelaide Festival.

See also
Geoff Cobham, lighting designer 2012–2018

Notes

References

Further reading

External links 
State Theatre Company

Theatre companies in Australia
Performing arts in Adelaide